Carlos Lima Fuentes (born 21 February 1970) is a Swiss male handball player, and coach.

He was a member of the Switzerland men's national handball team. He was part of the  team at the 1996 Summer Olympics, playing six matches.

Career 
During the 2004-2005 season, he played for the Spanish first division club CB Torrevieja, where he scored 59 goals in 28 matches.

References

1970 births
Living people
Swiss male handball players
Handball players at the 1996 Summer Olympics
Olympic handball players of Switzerland
Sportspeople from Lucerne